R (HS2 Action Alliance Ltd) v Secretary of State for Transport  [2014] UKSC 3 is a UK constitutional law case, concerning the conflict of law between a national legal system and European Union law.

Facts
The HS2 Action Alliance, Buckinghamshire County Council, Hillingdon London Borough Council, and Heathrow Hub Ltd claimed that the Secretary of State should have done a strategic environmental assessment under Directive 2001/42 before the government's 'Next Steps' Command Paper on HS2. This proposed a hybrid bill procedure in Parliament for constructing the High Speed 2 railway from London to Birmingham (phase 1), and then on to Manchester as well as Sheffield and Leeds (phase 2). The plaintiffs argued the Directive should be interpreted in line with the Convention on Access to Information, Public Participation in Decision-Making and Access to Justice in Environmental Matters 1998 (the Aarhus Convention 2001) art 7. They also argued that a hybrid bill procedure did not comply with the Environmental Impact Assessment Directive 2011/92/EU because the party whipped the vote, and limited opportunity to examine the information in Parliament. This was argued to fail the test for proper public participation under EIAD 2011 article 6(4).

Judgment
The Supreme Court held that the UK has constitutional instruments that the courts would not interpret to be abrogated without close scrutiny.

See also

Thoburn v Sunderland City Council
UK enterprise law
UK constitutional law

References

Constitutional laws of the United Kingdom
United Kingdom administrative case law
United Kingdom constitutional case law
High Speed 2